The Lower Chenab Canal is a canal in Pakistan. It was dug in 1892 and originates from Khanki Headworks, which is situated on the River Chenab in Gujranwala District.

Some distributaries coming out of Lower Chenab Canal are the Jhang Branch, the Rakh Branch and the Gugera Branch Canal.

References

Canals in Pakistan
Canals opened in 1892